Raymond Brown (born May 6, 1969) is a former backstroke swimmer from Canada.

Brown competed for his native country at the 1992 Summer Olympics in Barcelona, Spain. There he finished in 18th position in the 100-metre backstroke, and in 15th place in the 200-metre backstroke.

He currently is a financial advisor in Cleveland, Ohio.

References
sports-reference

1969 births
Living people
Canadian male backstroke swimmers
Canadian male medley swimmers
Canadian expatriates in the United States
Olympic swimmers of Canada
Pan American Games bronze medalists for Canada
Sportspeople from Cambridge, Ontario
Swimmers at the 1987 Pan American Games
Swimmers at the 1992 Summer Olympics
Swimmers from Ontario
Pan American Games medalists in swimming
Medalists at the 1987 Pan American Games
20th-century Canadian people